Chechen-Ool Mongush (28 May 1972, Khayelrakan, Tuva - died c. 9 June 2013) was a Russian former wrestler who competed in the 1996 Summer Olympics.
He was strangled to death in June 2013 by a man who confessed to the athlete's killing.

References

1972 births
2013 deaths
People from Dzun-Khemchiksky District
Tuvan people
Olympic wrestlers of Russia
Wrestlers at the 1996 Summer Olympics
Russian male sport wrestlers
Male murder victims
Russian murder victims
People murdered in Russia
Deaths by strangulation